The TVR 390SE is a sports car designed and built by TVR. It was introduced in October 1984. It featured many novelties not found in other 'Wedge' TVRs before and was also the most powerful one yet. It never received British Type Approval, so technically speaking the 390SE was just a 350i with special equipment fitted.

History
TVR Engineering worked with Andy Rouse, a Rover Tuning specialist to produce a blueprinted engine, turning out an extra , taking it to a claimed . The engine achieved these numbers by using some very interesting improvements such as an increased capacity of the engine to 3,905 cc, high lift camshafts, gas flowed cylinder heads with large valves and Cosworth machined pistons. A stronger clutch, limited slip differential and wider Yokohama tyres were fitted to help get the extra power down onto the road.

The styling of the car was also improved - or at any rate made more aggressive - with a deeper front air dam, and a rear under body aerofoil. Subsequent updating saw the bodyshell gain flared wheelarches and different sills. Ventilated front disc brakes and fifteen inch wheels were part of the package as well. A Series 2 car appeared in 1988 with the most obvious difference being a rounder nose.

Production of the modified Rover V8 was handled by different engineering companies throughout the car's life with most units being produced by North Coventry Kawasaki (NCK); which company was subsequently purchased by TVR to become their in-house engine division, TVR Power. About 100 390SEs were built.

Owing to the United Kingdom 'Type Approval' rules, it was not economical for TVR to homologate the small-volume 390SE as a separate model from their more common '350i' so the customer was invoiced for the car and engine work separately. Therefore most 390SEs are officially registered as 3.5 litre cars.

420SE

At the customer's request, further engine work could be performed taking the V8 to 4.2 L capacity - thus creating the '420SE' in the process, of which only seven were built in 1986 and 1987. These cars were development cars for the 4.2-litre V8 used in the later, wilder 420 SEAC. The SE, in addition to more restrained bodywork, also featured somewhat milder cams than did the SEAC. However, due to the development status and its being handbuilt, the specs of each 420SE built are likely to differ.

Specifications

References

390 SE
Sports cars
Rear-wheel-drive vehicles
Cars introduced in 1984
Cars discontinued in 1989